Pullen Island Conservation Park is a protected area includes all of Pullen Island about  south of Port Elliot in South Australia and about  south of Adelaide.

The park was proclaimed in 1972 under National Parks and Wildlife Act 1972 replacing earlier protected area status as a Fauna Conservation Reserve which was proclaimed in 1967. The protected area status exists to protect the island as a breeding area for sea birds such as little penguins and silver gulls.

The conservation park is classified as an IUCN Category IA protected area. In 1980, it was included on the now-defunct Register of the National Estate.

References

External links
Pullen Island Conservation Park web page on protected planet

Conservation parks of South Australia
Protected areas established in 1967
1967 establishments in Australia
Encounter Bay
South Australian places listed on the defunct Register of the National Estate